Dis/Connected is a BBC Three drama pilot, written by Howard Overman. It starred Holliday Grainger, Cloudia Swann, Aml Ameen, Bradley James, Laura Aikman, Katrina Rafferty and Lucy Evans.

Outline
Dis/Connected tells the story of a group of disconnected college-going teenagers from different backgrounds who are forced to re-examine their lives after Jenny, a mutual friend of theirs, takes her own life. Sophie dropped Jenny when she got in with a popular crowd; Anthony is the kid from the wrong side of the tracks who called the ambulance that fateful night; Ben is Jenny's ex who cheated on her; Emily was too busy partying to bother with Jenny's moods.

Postponement
Dis/Connected was originally scheduled to be screened on Monday, 25 February 2008, but the BBC decided to postpone it until Monday, 31 March 2008 because up to 17 teenagers had committed suicide in South Wales during the previous year.

Cast

Laura Aikman ... Paula 
Aml Ameen ... Anthony 
Daniel Anthony ... Kez 
Liz Cass ... Chloe 
Ben Davies ... Josh 
Hannah Donaldson ... Holly 
Lucy Evans ... Natasha  
Caroline Faber ... Sandra 
Meryl Fernandes ... Sara 
Holliday Grainger ... Jenny 
Bradley James ... Ben 
Richard Lumsden ... David 
Janet Montgomery ... Lucy 
Dominique Moore ... Emily 
Wayne Powerdavis ... Jason 
Sakuntala Ramanee ... Trisha 
Kyle Redmond-Jones ... Oliver 
Cloudia Swann ... Sophie

References

External links

BBC television dramas
2008 television specials
Television pilots not picked up as a series